Brigadier General Ralph Wilson Hoyt (October 8, 1849 - November 3, 1920) was commander of the Department of the Lakes.

Biography
He was born on October 8, 1849 in Milo, New York to Benjamin Levi Hoyt and Celestia Ursula Mariner. He was admitted to the United States Military Academy at West Point, New York in 1868, and he graduated in 1872.

He married Mary C. Cravens Hoyt (1860-1910), and she died in 1910.

On August 15, 1911 he replaced William Harding Carter in command of the maneuver brigade in Texas.

On October 10, 1911 he married Cora McKeever Harbold (1879-1946), a nurse, in Philadelphia, Pennsylvania.

He died on November 3, 1920 in Penn Yan, New York. He was buried in Lakeview Cemetery in Penn Yan, New York.

References

External links

1849 births
1920 deaths
Brigadier generals
United States Army generals
United States Military Academy alumni